USNS Mary Sears (T-AGS 65) is a  oceanographic survey ship. It is the sixth ship of its class.  Mary Sears is named after Commander Mary Sears of the United States Naval Reserve, who was instrumental in the development of the Woods Hole Oceanographic Institution and is regarded as one of the initial oceanographers in the United States Navy.

The ship has sonar, underwater metal detection and satellite imagery capabilities.

In mid January 2007, Mary Sears deployed to Sulawesi, Indonesia to aid in the search for the missing Adam Air Flight 574. Mary Sears had also detected "heavy debris scattered over a wide area".

References

External links
 
 Biography of Mary Sears at Naval History and Heritage Command

 

Pathfinder-class survey ships
Ships built in Pascagoula, Mississippi
2000 ships